The Lorrain dormouse (Graphiurus lorraineus) is a species of rodent in the family Gliridae. It is found in Cameroon, Democratic Republic of the Congo, Ghana, Guinea-Bissau, Liberia, Nigeria, Sierra Leone, Tanzania, and Uganda. Its natural habitats are subtropical or tropical, moist, lowland forests, moist savanna, and plantations .

References
Holden, M. E.. 2005. Family Gliridae. pp. 819–841 in Mammal Species of the World a Taxonomic and Geographic Reference. D. E. Wilson and D. M. Reeder eds. Johns Hopkins University Press, Baltimore.
 Schlitter, D. & Grubb, P. 2004.  Graphiurus lorraineus.   2006 IUCN Red List of Threatened Species.   Downloaded on 29 July 2007.

Further reading

Graphiurus
Mammals described in 1910
Taxonomy articles created by Polbot